I'll enter heaven dancing (original French title: J'entrerai au ciel en dansant) is a 2016 documentary film that gives account of how the Rwandan genocide ended the life of a Rwandan couple.

Synopsis 
The film showed the life of Cyprien and Daphrose Rugamba from the difficult years of marriage until they were killed, together with 6 of their 10 children at their home in Kigali on the first day of the genocide.

Impact 
The Catholic Church opened their process for beatification a year ago, in September 2015.

References

External links 

2016 films
Rwandan documentary films
Films about the Rwandan genocide